Westborough High School may refer to:

 Westborough High School (Massachusetts), Westborough, Massachusetts
 Westborough High School, Dewsbury, West Yorkshire, England